Oropom (Oworopom, Oyoropom, Oropoi) is an African language, possibly spurious and, if real, almost certainly extinct. The language was purportedly once spoken by the Oropom people in northeastern Uganda and northwestern Kenya between the Turkwel River, the Chemorongit Mountains, and Mount Elgon.

History of research
There is only one article containing any original research on the language, Wilson (1970), which only a handful of other articles discuss. John G. Wilson's article furnishes only a short word list, and was written at a time when the language, if it existed, was nearly extinct. The article was based mainly on the limited memories of two very old women, one "a child of one of the residual Oropom families that had remained after the break-up of the Oropom here (Matheniko county)" who "remembered a few words of the language", the other an old lady called Akol "descended from the prisoners taken by the Karimojong on the Turkwel" who was "able to furnish many Oropom words". Under the circumstances, only the barest details of Oropom could be ascertained.

On this basis, Wilson concluded that it must have had at least two dialects: one spoken around the Turkwel area, containing a significant number of Luo words, and some Bantu words, and one spoken around Matheniko county with fewer Luo words. Both contain Kalenjin loanwords.

Classification
Wilson ascribed it to the Khoisan group, seemingly based solely on its physical appearance; but this identification is unreliable; Harold C. Fleming describes it as a "ridiculous suggestion". Elderkin (1983) says that "The Oropom data of Wilson (1970) shows some resemblances to Kuliak, some of which could well be mediated through Nilotic, with which it seems to have more resemblances (F. Rottland, personal communication)... There are many fewer resemblances worth noting with Hadza and only a minimal number with Sandawe." He quotes 8 potentially similar words between Oropom and Hadza, and 4 between Oropom and Sandawe. Harold Fleming also notes that "initial inspection suggests some possible commonality" between Oropom and the Kuliak languages, a probably Nilo-Saharan relic group found in Northern Uganda among such tribes as the Ik. However, in the absence of further work, Oropom remains an unclassified language.

Skepticism
Bernd Heine, who surveyed the area less than ten years after Wilson and found no trace of the language, expressed skepticism that it existed at all. Both Lionel Bender and Roger Blench have opined that the language was made up as a joke. Souag (2004) lists several motives Wilson's informants might have had to fabricate the language, and observes that even in his article, Wilson notes that he had to deal with "charlatans" once word got out that he was looking for anyone with knowledge of the language.

Wordlist
This wordlist, taken from the appendix to Wilson (1970), is based on Akol's memories (and thus is considered by Wilson as belonging to the "Turkwell dialect").  He says that he collected words from the other dialect as well, but apparently never published them.  The list consists of less than a hundred words, which are likely to be all the vocabulary that will ever be known of the language.

 Arrow: motit
 Bad: girito
 Black: timu
 Blue: puthia
 To boil water: mak
 Bow: terema
 To burn: mala
 Breast: kisina
 Brother: lukiya
 Bull: losogol
 Cat: ariet
 Cattle: pange
 Chalcedony: atunatun
 Child: muto
 Clever person: woth
 To cook: ipo
 Cooking pot (black): kiriente
 Cooking pot: kodo
 Cow: ngobo
 Cowrie shell: pel
 Crocodile: moro
 To cut: tubo
 Day: awar
 To dig: chege
 Dog: kokuye
 Dry: de-au
 Ear-ring: napiroi
 Ear: ki-ito
 Egg: iken
 Eland: ongor
 Enemy: bu
 Eye: kongiye
 Fat: moda
 Father: mamunyu
 Fire: emaa
 Fish: karu
 food: araukoo
 Fool: bung
 Foot: apaukoo
 Gazelle: tuth
 To give: we
 Goat: ngoror
 Good: pau
 Grass: purung
 Grooved design on pots: nacipa
 Hair: akopito
 Hand: akeleng
 Hard: keter
 Honey: madik
 House: apirgoo
 Leopard: meri
 To lie down: lura
 Lion: ru
 Man: muren
 Mark on forehead: nageran
 To marry: ritha
 Meat: apintoo
 Milk: coko
 Moon: Pele
 Mother-in-law: yo
 Mother: iyoo
 Neck bangles: gorom
 Night: riono
 Nose: torom
 Oil: konoye
 Old man: kuko
 Old woman: kukuye
 Penis: oyaa
 Rain: lat
 To receive: aruka
 Red: kopurat
 Seer: murwe
 Sheep: merek
 Sister: pese
 To sit: paja
 To sleep: sanan
 Snake: kwolta
 Soft: lujuk
 Soil: nyapid
 To speak: dokol
 Spear: ngokit
 Stone wrist bangle: aurare
 Sun: Aca
 To swim: redik
 Thief: mokorat
 Tooth: ne-et
 Tree: telegai
 Vagina: kibunte
 To walk: pauwo
 Warrior: lim
 Water: lata
 Wet: ret
 White: pele
 Witch: ariet
 Wizard: rimirim
 Woman: nakwanta
 Women's apron: ongor

Bibliography
 J. G. Wilson.  "Preliminary Observations on the Oropom People of Karamoja, their Ethnic Status, Culture, and Postulated Relation to the Peoples of the Late Stone Age." The Uganda Journal, 34, 2, 1970. pp. 125–145.
 Elderkin, E. D. (1983) 'Tanzanian and Ugandan isolates'. In Nilotic studies: proceedings of the international symposium on languages and history of the Nilotic peoples, Cologne, January 4–6, 1982 vol. 2 / Rainer Vossen, Marianne Bechhaus-Gerst (eds ), vol. 2, pp 499–521.
 Harold C. Fleming (1983) 'Kuliak External Relations: Step One'. In Nilotic studies: proceedings of the international symposium on languages and history of the Nilotic peoples, Cologne, January 4–6, 1982 vol. 2 / Rainer Vossen, Marianne Bechhaus-Gerst (eds ), vol. 2, p. 429.
 Blench, Roger M. 1999. "Are the African pygmies an ethnographic fiction?" Central African hunter-gatherers in a multidisciplinary perspective: challenging elusiveness, pp 41–60. Edited by Karen Biesbrouck, Stefan Elders & Gerda Rossel. Research School of Asian, African and Amerindian Studies (CNWS), State University of Leiden. Leiden.
 Blench, Roger M. 1993. "Recent Developments in African Language Classification" The Archaeology of Africa: Food, Metals and Towns, edited by Thurstan Shaw, page 135.

References

Weblinks 

 Biography of John G. Wilson

Languages of Uganda
Extinct languages of Africa
Unclassified languages of Africa
Spurious languages
Languages extinct in the 1950s